The University of Idaho Gymnasium and Armory is a historic building on the campus of the University of Idaho in Moscow, Idaho. It was built as a gym and armory in 1903. In 1928, the gym was moved to another building, Memorial Gymnasium. 

The building was designed by John E. Tourtellotte in the Romanesque Revival architectural style. It has been listed on the National Register of Historic Places since January 3, 1983.

References

University and college buildings on the National Register of Historic Places in Idaho
National Register of Historic Places in Latah County, Idaho
University and college buildings completed in 1903
Romanesque architecture in the United States
University of Idaho buildings and structures
1903 establishments in Idaho